P.A.O. Rouf (Greek: Ποδοσφαιρικός Αθλητικός Όμιλος Ρουφ; English: Football Athletic Club Rouf) is a Greek football club, based in Rouf, Athens.  The association was founded in 1947.  The club has played in its traditional colours of red and white since its creation in 1947, after World War II.  The chairman of the club is Athanasios Kafezas, a Greek businessman.  The current stadium is the Rouf Municipal Stadium Rouf-Dimitris Giannakopoulos, seating 1,600 spectators.

History
In 1968, Amyna Rouf and Erigona merged with Rouf.

In 2009, they promoted to Gamma Ethniki.  During the 2011–12 season Rouf were active in the Football League 2 - South in Greece and spent their third consecutive season in the third tier of Greek football.  On occasion the club has been criticised for being a "mesh up" of several Greek clubs including Olympiacos Piraeus and Panathinaikos.

The average attendance at Rouf's home games in the 2011–12 season was 467, An increase on the 2010–11 season by 109.  Dimitris Arnoutis is the manager and head coach of the club and has enjoyed a run of success since taking over from Michalis Papadopoulos in late 2007.  He is the longest serving manager at the club since Costas Gianakis from 1956 to 1970.

In the 2012–13 season, the club played in the Delta Ethniki (Group 2).

Ranking history

1972: Second Division - Group 2: 3rd
1973: Second Division - Group 1: 3rd
1974: Second Division - Group 1: 9th
1975: Second Division - Group 1: 14th - relegated
2009: Delta Ethniki - Group 8: 1st (57 pts)
2010–11: Football League 2 - South Group: 11th
2011–12: Football League 2 - South Group: 12th - relegated

Season to season

Sources:

League history

Cup appearances

Athens Cup:
1976: Defeated Kallithea F.C. 3-2
2002: Defeated Thrasyvoulos Fyli 1-0
2009: Defeated Olympiakos Liossia 2-1
Greek Cup:
1976: Niki Volos - Rouf: 2-1

Notable former players
  Imran Chamkhanov
Michael Giannoukakis
Ioannis Georgopoulos (later appeared in Apollon Athens)
Giannakopoulos brothers
Vasilis Kandias (later appeared in Fostiras Tavros)
Kotsos brothers
Georgios Labrou (later appeared in Ionikos)
Panagiotis Livas (later appeared in Halkida and the Greece national team)
Polioudakis
Athanassios Remoundos (later appeared in Ethnikos Piraeus and Ethnikos Elpida)
Sainis
Simatos brothers
Stergios Stergiou (later appeared in Olympiacos, Panegialios and Ionikos)
Takounas
Themis Vangis (later appeared in Panathinaikos and Aris Thessaloniki)
Xynias

References

External links
Official website 

Football clubs in Attica
1947 establishments in Greece
Association football clubs established in 1947
Gamma Ethniki clubs